Holcocera adjutrix is a moth in the family Blastobasidae. It was described by Edward Meyrick in 1918. It is found in Guyana.

References

adjutrix
Moths described in 1918